The Philippine tailorbird (Orthotomus castaneiceps) is a species of bird formerly placed in the "Old World warbler" assemblage, but now placed in the family Cisticolidae. It is native to the western Philippines.

Its natural habitats are subtropical or tropical moist lowland forests and subtropical or tropical mangrove forests.

References

Philippine tailorbird
Endemic birds of the Philippines
Birds of Cebu
Birds of Negros Island
Birds of Panay
Fauna of Masbate
Philippine tailorbird
Philippine tailorbird
Taxonomy articles created by Polbot